KL International Inter City Kabaddi Championships is conducted in Kuala Lumpur, Malaysia, annually since 2008. This kabaddi tournament includes teams representing cities in Asia and worldwide, and is conducted by the Kabaddi Association of Kuala Lumpur as part of its development and promotional programme.

2008
The inaugural championships was officially launched by the Olympic Council of Malaysia (OCM) secretary Datuk Sieh Kok Chi on December 11, 2008. The championships was held at the Pulapol Stadium, Police Training Centre in the city from December 26–28. A total of five cities took part in the men's competition: Kuala Lumpur, Putrajaya, Colombo, New Delhi and Patialla. There were four teams in the women's competition, namely Kuala Lumpur, Patialla, Colombo and Triconmalee. Competition were held as round robin competition with the top teams playing the final.

The preliminary results:

MEN

WOMEN

The men's final was played between Patialla and Kuala Lumpur, with Patialla edging out Kuala Lumpur  61-59 in a closely fought competition. Third place was won by Colombo, who received a walkover from Delhi.

Kuala Lumpur's K. Siva picked up two individual awards for his efforts – Top Scorer and Best Player of the tournament. Punjab’s Vijay Kumar was adjudged as the Best Raider. Colombo’s KS Meegastanne was given the Best Defence award.

Punjab won the women's competition ahead of Colombo. Punjab’s Navneet K took the Best Player and Best Defence awards while another Punjab player Parveen K took the Top Scorer Award. Colombo’s Lakmali was adjudged as the Best Raider.

2010
The second championships was held from March 5–7 at the Stadium Titiwangsa in Kuala Lumpur. This championships saw an increased number of teams. The men's competition saw a total of eight teams taking part: Kuala Lumpur, Putrajaya, Patialla, Chennai, Oslo, Kuala Lumpur Presidents XII, New Delhi and Kapurthala. Oslo, Jagatpura, Kuala Lumpur and Putrajaya took part in the women's competition. New Delhi were forced to withdraw after failing to produce sufficient players.

Results of the preliminary round matches:

MEN

WOMEN

References

Kabaddi competitions
Kabaddi